Alberto Broggi is General Manager at VisLab srl (spinoff of the University of Parma acquired by Silicon-Valley company Ambarella Inc. in June 2015) and  a professor of Computer Engineering at the University of Parma in Italy.

Research in computer vision, hardware, and AV 
Broggi's research activities started in 1991–1994. His group together with the Dipartimento di Elettronica, Politecnico di Torino, Italy, built their own hardware architecture (named PAPRICA, for PArallel PRocessor for Image Checking and Analysis, based on 256 single-bit processing elements working in SIMD fashion) and installed it on board of a mobile laboratory (Mob-Lab) to develop and test some initial concepts in the field of intelligent vehicles.

In 1996, Broggi's group worked to develop a real vehicle prototype (named ARGO, a Lancia Thema passenger car which was equipped with vision sensors, processing systems, and vehicle actuators) and developed the necessary software and hardware that made it able to drive autonomously on standard roads.

Broggi's research group (called VisLab from then on) gathered all their findings in a book, which was then also translated in Chinese.

When Broggi was with the University of Pavia, his research was extended and applied to extreme conditions (automatic driving on snow  and ice): in 2001, VisLab led the research effort of  providing a vehicle (RAS, Robot Antartico di Superficie) with sensing capabilities so that it was able to automatically follow the vehicle in front.

In 2010 Broggi's group embarked on driving 4 vehicles autonomously from Italy to China with no human intervention. This challenge is called VIAC, for VisLab Intercontinental Autonomous Challenge

. Soon after this, Broggi was awarded a second ERC grant (Proof of concept) to industrialize some of the results obtained and successfully tested on the VIAC vehicles.

On July 12, 2013, VisLab tested the BRAiVE vehicle in downtown Parma, negotiating two-way narrow rural roads, pedestrian crossings, traffic lights, artificial bumps, pedestrian areas, and tight roundabouts. The vehicle traveled from Parma University Campus up to Piazza della Pilotta (downtown Parma): a 20 minutes run in a real environment, together with real traffic at 11am on a working day, that required absolutely no human intervention. Part of this test was driven with nobody in the driver seat, for the first time ever on public roads.

References

External links 
Research papers by Alberto Broggi (Google Scholar)

Artificial intelligence researchers
Italian computer scientists
Living people
Machine learning researchers
Italian roboticists
University of Parma alumni
Academic staff of the University of Parma
1966 births
20th-century Italian scientists
21st-century Italian scientists
European Research Council grantees